Variospora aegaea is a species of saxicolous (rock-dwelling), crustose lichen in the family Teloschistaceae. First identified from Greek islands in the Aegean Sea (after which it is named), and has since been recorded in Italy and Spain.

Taxonomy
The lichen was formally described as a new species in 2002 in Dutch lichenologist Harrie Sipman. There the lichen was found growing on west- and south-facing schistose rock outcrops. The lichen was named for its Greek distribution, as it was first recorded from Paros, Antiparos, and Kalymnos, which are Greek islands in the Aegean Sea. It was transferred to the newly circumscribed genus Variospora in 2013 following a molecular phylogenetic study of the family Teloschistaceae.

Description

Variospora aegaea has a yellowish to brownish-orange thallus that is placodioid with an areolate centre and a lobed margin. The individuals areoles are convex and measure about 0.2–0.4 mm wide. The lobes on the margin are about 1–1.5 mm long and 0.2–0.3 mm wide, and have a loose attachment to its substrate;. The width of the upper cortex ranges between 20 and 60 μm. The algal layer (containing the photobiont partner), about 100 μm thick, contains scattered bundles of periclinal hyphae. Apothecia are frequent on the thallus surface; they are rounded, typically measuring 0.4–0.8 μm in diameter. They have a distinct margin (about 0.1 mm wide), and a somewhat darker disc. The ascospores, which number 8 per ascus, are hyaline, and polarilocular (divided into two polar components). They initially have an ellipsoid shape before widening with a widened septum, reaching dimensions of 10–15 by 9–11 μm, with a septum that is 4–5 μm thick.

Habitat and distribution
It has been found in Paros, Antiparos and Kalimnos in the Aegean Sea, as well as Sardinia, Italy, and in southeastern Spain.

References

Teloschistales
Lichen species
Lichens described in 2002
Lichens of Europe
Taxa named by Harrie Sipman